Luca Iotti (born 9 November 1995) is an Italian footballer who plays as a defender for  club Mantova.

Club career
He made his Serie C debut for Olbia on 26 February 2017 in a game against Giana Erminio.

On 29 August 2019, he signed a 2-year contract with Teramo.

On 26 January 2021 he moved to Feralpisalò.

On 6 July 2021, he joined Matelica.

On 14 July 2022, Iotti signed with Mantova.

References

External links
 

1995 births
Living people
Sportspeople from the Metropolitan City of Milan
Italian footballers
Association football defenders
Serie C players
A.C. Milan players
Ascoli Calcio 1898 F.C. players
Olbia Calcio 1905 players
S.S. Teramo Calcio players
FeralpiSalò players
Ancona-Matelica players
Mantova 1911 players
Segunda División B players
Tercera División players
Elche CF Ilicitano footballers
Italian expatriate footballers
Italian expatriate sportspeople in Spain
Expatriate footballers in Spain
Italy youth international footballers
Footballers from Lombardy